Idlirvirissong, or Irdlirvirisissong, is an evil spirit in the religion of the Inuit of Baffin Island and the Greenlandic Inuit.

Description
In most descriptions, Idlirvirissong is a female, though some give Idlirvirissong's gender as a male.

Idlirvirissong is a demonic, evil spirit usually depicted as a clown, with a nose "turned up on the side." Idlirvirissong owns many dogs, and together with them Idlirvirissong lives in a house in the sky, where she awaits the arrival of the newly deceased. When the deceased arrive, Idlirvirissong will dance while saying "Qimitiaka nexessaqtaqpaka" ("I am looking for food for my dogs"). Those who laugh at Idlirvirissong and her dance will have their bodies cut open, and their intestines placed on a Idlirvirissong's plate called qengmerping and be fed to the dogs. Those who do not laugh are spared.

Idlirvirissong is said to be the cousin of the spirit of the Sun, to whom she is opposed, though in some versions she is the cousin of the Moon spirit Aningan instead. In one version recounted by the Inuit of Smith Sound, Aningan warns people not to laugh around Idlirvirissong.

Other versions
In other parts of Greenland, she is known as the Erdlaveersissok, the "entrail-seizer." In Baffin Island a similar figure known as Ululiernang or Ululiarnåq is present. Ululiernang has a hollow back with her entrails missing, and she offers the entrails she acquired to the moon's ermine. Explorer Knud Rasmussen recorded a story as told by Orulo, an Inuit woman from Admiralty Inlet on Baffin Island:

References

Bibliography
 
 
 
 
 
 
 

Inuit mythology
Demons